Mirsk  is a town in Lwówek Śląski County, Lower Silesian Voivodeship, in south-western Poland. It is the seat of the administrative district (gmina) called Gmina Mirsk, close to the Czech border.

As of 2019, the town has a population of 3,886.

History
The settlement arose in the 13th century where the medieval trade route from Jelenia Góra to Zittau crossed the border with Upper Lusatia. As a result of the fragmentation of Poland, in 1319 it became part the small Piast-ruled Duchy of Jawor. In the course of the German Ostsiedlung, it received town privileges by the Duke Henry I of Jawor in 1337 (according to other sources in 1329). Upon the death of his successor Duke Bolko II the Small in 1368, it passed to the Bohemian Crown and was enfeoffed to the noble House of Schaffgotsch in 1425. In 1431 it was successfully defended against the Hussites. An annual fair took place in the town from 1521. During the Thirty Years' War, troops from various countries plundered the town as many as 31 times.

With most of Silesia, it was annexed as Friedeberg by Prussia in 1742 and incorporated into the Silesia Province. In 1938, part of the village of Skarbków was merged with the town. During World War II the Germans created a branch of the Gross-Rosen concentration camp for Jewish women in Skarbków. After the defeat of Nazi Germany in World War II, the border changes demanded by the Soviet Union at the Potsdam Conference placed the town in Polish territory. In 1961 the entire village of Skarbków was included within the town limits.

Former names
German names, 1201–1945: Eulendorf, Fridberg, Friedeberg; Friedeberg am Queis to distinguish it from Brandenburgian Friedeberg (Strzelce Krajeńskie), Friedeberg/Isergebirge from 1934; for a short period after World War II literally translated as  meaning "peaceful mountain". The present name, adopted in 1947, is derived from the Russian word "mir", translated as "peace", however, this word does not exist in the Polish language. It is possible that the post-war Polish authorities in Mirsk were forced to show gratitude to the Soviet Red Army for supposed liberation from the Nazis and for granting Poland the "Recovered Territories".

Twin towns – sister cities
See twin towns of Gmina Mirsk.

References

External links

Official town webpage

Cities and towns in Lower Silesian Voivodeship
Lwówek Śląski County
Cities in Silesia